The 2019–20 Tennessee Tech Golden Eagles men's basketball team represented Tennessee Technological University during the 2019–20 NCAA Division I men's basketball season. The Golden Eagles, led by first-year head coach John Pelphrey, played their home games at the Eblen Center in Cookeville, Tennessee as members of the Ohio Valley Conference. They finished the season 9–22, 6–12 in OVC play to finish in ninth place. They failed to qualify for the OVC tournament.

Previous season 
The Golden Eagles finished the 2018–19 season 8–23 overall, 4–14 in OVC play to finish in last place and failed to qualify for the OVC tournament.

On March 3, 2019, the school announced that head coach Steve Payne had resigned after eight seasons at Tennessee Tech. On April 6, the school hired John Pelphrey, an assistant at Alabama, as the next head coach.

Roster

Schedule and results

|-
!colspan=9 style=| Exhibition

|-
!colspan=9 style=| Non-conference regular season

|-
!colspan=9 style=| OVC regular season

Source

References

Tennessee Tech Golden Eagles men's basketball seasons
Tennessee Tech
Tennessee Tech Golden Eagles men's basketball
Tennessee Tech Golden Eagles men's basketball